Pavol Pitoňák (born ) is a Slovak male curler and curling coach.

As a coach of Slovak wheelchair curling team he participated in 2018 Winter Paralympics.

Teams

Men's

Mixed

Mixed doubles

Record as a coach of national teams

Personal life
He is from big family of curlers: three of his brothers (František, Tomáš and Peter) are Pavol's teammates, they played together many times on European championships and other international curling tournaments; one more his brother Dušan played wheelchair curling (Pavol and František coaches their wheelchair team on Worlds and Winter Paralympics); other family members also are curlers or coaches.

References

External links

Coach Profile - Pavol PITONAK - World Para Nordic Skiing - Live results | International Paralympic Committee
Pitoňák Pavol - Český svaz curlingu
 Video: 

Living people
1972 births
Slovak male curlers
Slovak curling coaches